
This is a timeline of Swiss history, comprising important legal and territorial changes and political events in Switzerland and its predecessor states.  To read about the background to these events, see History of Switzerland.

 Centuries: 13th14th15th16th17th18th19th20th21st

13th century

14th century

15th century

16th century

17th century

18th century

19th century

20th century

21st century

References 

Switzerland
Switzerland history-related lists